Alexandra Vyacheslavovna Patskevich (born 4 November 1988) is a Russian competitor in synchronized swimming. She is a three-time Olympic, 13-time World and four-time European champion. 

Patskevich works in the Presidential Administration of Russia. She is married to the Olympic swimmer Grigory Falko, they have a son Semyon (born 2019).

References

Living people
Olympic gold medalists for Russia
Olympic gold medalists for the Russian Olympic Committee athletes
Russian synchronized swimmers
Olympic synchronized swimmers of Russia
Synchronized swimmers at the 2012 Summer Olympics
Synchronized swimmers at the 2016 Summer Olympics
Synchronized swimmers at the 2020 Summer Olympics
Olympic medalists in synchronized swimming
1988 births
Medalists at the 2012 Summer Olympics
Medalists at the 2016 Summer Olympics
Medalists at the 2020 Summer Olympics
World Aquatics Championships medalists in synchronised swimming
Synchronized swimmers at the 2015 World Aquatics Championships
Synchronized swimmers at the 2013 World Aquatics Championships
Synchronized swimmers at the 2011 World Aquatics Championships
Synchronized swimmers at the 2009 World Aquatics Championships
Synchronized swimmers at the 2017 World Aquatics Championships
Swimmers from Moscow
Universiade medalists in synchronized swimming
Universiade gold medalists for Russia
European Aquatics Championships medalists in synchronised swimming
Medalists at the 2013 Summer Universiade